Khin Khin is a Burmese name that may refer to the following notable people:
Khin Khin Gyi, Burmese physician and government official 
Khin Khin Htoo (born 1965), Burmese writer
Khin Khin Win, wife of former President of Myanmar Thein Sein
Dagon Khin Khin Lay (1904–1981), Burmese novelist, screenwriter, and cinematographer
Daing Khin Khin (c.1863–1882), concubine of Thibaw Min, the last monarch of the Konbaung dynasty
Khin Khin Htwe (born 1962), Burmese middle-distance runner

Burmese names